Kannum Kannum Kollaiyadithaal is a 2020 Indian Tamil-language romantic comedy caper film written and directed by Desingh Periyasamy in his directorial debut. The film stars Dulquer Salmaan, Ritu Varma, Rakshan and Niranjani Ahathian portraying in the lead roles, while the latter two were making their acting debuts. The film was released on 28 February 2020 and was successful at the box office.

Plot 

Siddharth and Kaliswaran Moorthy are two youngsters in Chennai who apparently have no family and are living alone. They are shown as freelance techies working from home. Siddharth falls for a door-to-door beautician, Meera. He proposes to her and she accepts. Kallis has a crush on Meera's friend, Shreya, a chef. Meera is revealed to be an orphan brought up in an orphanage and Shreya is revealed to be sent away to fend for herself as her family faces trouble from loan sharks back in her hometown. The guys spend their money and soon realise they are running low. This is when it is shown that they are con artists, who use online shopping scams to earn money.

DCP Pratap Chakravarthy begins to investigate their scam when his daughter's laptop explodes. He realizes that the scammers use the addresses of abandoned houses and public Wi-Fi to order electronic products on online platforms and return or re-sell them online after replacing original internal parts with old and duplicate ones. As DCP Pratap tries to track down the culprits, Siddharth changes their plan and now the boys loot expensive items from luxury cars by developing a device that hacks into the locking systems of such cars. Pratap almost closes down on them when the boys steal his friend's laptop from his car and try to sell it, but the boys escape successfully. Meera calls Siddharth and informs him that her handbag was snatched. She cries that though only  was stolen, it had been hard-earned money. Siddharth feels guilty and the friends decide to mend their ways.

They decide to settle in Goa by starting a restaurant with the remaining money from their scams and move to Goa with Meera and Shreya. Pratap tracks down the boys' address only to find the house vacated. He soon follows them to Goa. It is then shown that, though Pratap was investigating the online electronic products scam and the car thefts. He had actually begun tracking Meera and Shreya, who are even bigger con artists than Siddharth and Kallis. He informs them that the girls' motive is to make men fall for them, then loot their money. He had initially identified Meera as one of the con artistes using a distinctive necklace that had been in the handbag snatched from her, then identified her connection to the guys, following which he had gone to Siddharth and Kallis's former home in Chennai and had eventually traced them to Goa. Siddharth and Kallis find their bag of money missing and are heartbroken to discover that the girls they had truly loved had cheated them.

They hitchhike to Chennai with empty pockets and slowly use their criminal minds to find the girls. They figure out that the girls are at Delhi, with Meera in the identity of Ishita, a freelance room arrangement consultant and confront them. Shocked, the girls return the bag of money and ask them to leave, but Siddharth proposes that they team up and share the amount they steal in the next venture. If the girls fall for them in the process, they will remain together. Otherwise, they plan to share the loot and part ways. It is also revealed that Meera's real name is Madhumitha and Shreya's real name is Varsha, and that both of them were orphans in the same orphanage, who had taken to con artists after being fed up of the deceit in society, especially its men. Madhu and Varsha agree to Siddharth's deal. They decide to target a rich, old businessman named Sooraj Mehta, who is in love with Madhu (as Ishita) in meditation class. Varsha also befriends Sooraj's wife in gym.

Using their technological brain,  the gang slowly break down the security features in Sooraj's car and house. Using a spycam in Madhu's phone and a voice recorder designed as a bracelet. However, they realize that  Suraj is a drug baron, who has 1 million in his house, which is equivalent to ₹ 71 crore. When the others decide to play safe by dropping the plan, Siddharth convinces them to stay on, and flee overseas after the heist to avoid Sooraj's wrath. They plan to enter the garage in Sooraj's house by using his Rolls-Royce and get his fingerprint to enter the locker room using a 3D printer. As per Siddharth's plan, Varsha is to spend the day shopping with Sooraj's wife and Madhu is to spend time with Sooraj, while the guys loot the money using Sooraj's car. They plan to hijack Sooraj's car while it is parked at the Hyatt Hotel car park, and use it to enter Sooraj's compound, knowing that they will not be seen as the car's windshield and windows are tinted.

However, their plan changes when Sooraj drives to his private guesthouse instead of the Hyatt Hotel, to the surprise of Madhu and the others. Shocked, the guys follow the car to a suburban area. Madhu is inside with Sooraj and the guys have only one hour to complete the heist, instead of the two that they had planned for. Siddharth tells Kallis that Sooraj's car is advanced and can be hacked to do many things. He opens an app he had devised and has the car drive itself out of the guesthouse, with some help from Kallis. They then drive to Sooraj's house and safely enter the garage but finds out that to enter through the second security door in the garage, a pattern is required. Siddharth asks Madhu to find out Sooraj's phone pattern and the guys successfully enter the garage. With the 3D printed thumbprint, they enter the locker room, open the locker and steal the money. Madhu fakes a fainting and a nosebleed and the guys return the car to the guesthouse, just in time for Sooraj to rush an 'unconscious' Madhu to the hospital. When Sooraj goes in to bring out the doctors, Madhu escapes.

Since it would be impossible to take the cash out of the country through an airport without raising suspicion, Siddharth tells that they are going to Thailand by road and the pairs set off on their bikes. However, they encounter Pratap doing vehicle checks at their hotel gate and Siddharth devises a plan quickly. Before the guys leave to confuse Pratap, the girls reveal that they have fallen in love with them. Happily, the guys rush off and tell Pratap that the girls are escaping in a white car. Following a car that the guys point out, Pratap assumes that they are going to the airport. He then assaults a security guard at the airport and breaches the airport security to apprehend the girls, and the guys escape. Siddharth and Kallis call Madhu and tell the girls that they have all the money and that the bags in the bikes are empty. They say that it is their plan of vengeance and that the cops will reach their location in a few minutes.

The girls are left shocked and devastated, and tell themselves that they deserve this for cheating Siddharth and Kallis in the first place. However, when the police vehicle enters the hideout, Siddarth and Kallis get out of the car and say that they were just messing around and that the money really had been in the bags that the girls had. They say that because the girls didn't try to run away but stayed on feeling they deserved this for cheating Siddharth and Kallis, they think the girls have really started loving them and both couples reconcile and decide to settle down. In Chennai, Pratap is being questioned by the CBI for breaching airport security and for abandoning a high-profile match-fixing case that he had been working in Delhi (for which he had been checking vehicles) to go after two girls who are small-scale cheaters. It is revealed that Pratap was also a victim of Madhu's scams. 

In a scene mimicking a scene from Gautham Vasudev Menon's romantic film Vinnaithaandi Varuvaayaa, he had gifted her a rare, expensive necklace to Madhu — the same one that he had used to track her down when her handbag was stolen in the first place. Ashamed to declare that he was also a victim, Pratap hangs his head low and it is indicated that he might face a suspension for abandoning his match-fixing case. Back at Sooraj's house, Sooraj watches a CCTV footage of Siddharth and Kallis stealing the money but their face is hidden. The guys have used infrared flashlights on their caps, which have deceived the camera. Sooraj cannot complain to the cops as it is illegal money. As they are camping on their way to Thailand, Madhumita sees her name tattooed on Siddarth's forearm and she guiltily tells that it is not her real name, only to get deceived as Siddarth, who rubs the ink off and Varsha reveals herself as Thenmozhi and Madhumita asks Siddharth to guess her name and all four of them squabble on.

Cast 

 Dulquer Salmaan as Siddharth (Sid)
 Ritu Varma as Meera / Madhumitha / Ishita / Jessie
 Rakshan as Kallis aka Kaaleeswaramurthy
 Niranjani Ahathian as Thenmozhi / Shreya / Varsha
 Gautham Vasudev Menon as DCP Prathap Chakravarthi
 Anish Kuruvilla as Sooraj Mehta  (Drug Dealer)
Vikash Rajendran as Amjith (Prathap's assistant)
Tiger Garden Thangadurai as Two wheeler mechanic
Ameesha Chowdhary as Mrs Mehta
Udhayabhanu Maheshwaran as CBI Higher Official
Gajaraj as a house owner
Lakshmi as Mrs Prathap Chakravarthi
Baby Monika Siva as Prathap's daughter
Kathir as Prathap's son
Jacqueline as Kallis's friend (cameo appearance)

Production

Development
Dulquer Salmaan agreed to collaborate with debutant director Desingh Periyasamy for a Tamil film in February 2017, and chose to make the film before another proposed Tamil film by director Ra. Karthik. Desingh revealed that the film would be a "romantic thriller", with Dulquer portraying a "happy-go-lucky" youngster in the film. The film was initially set to begin production in July 2017, but was delayed as the team looked for a suitable lead actress. Ritu Varma joined the team to play the lead actress during September 2017. Rakshan, a television anchor, was also selected to make his acting debut in the film. In November 2017, the film was titled Kannum Kannum Kollaiyadithaal, which was inspired by a song by A. R. Rahman in Mani Ratnam's Thiruda Thiruda (1993). A film with the same name had been planned by Pandiarajan in 2002, but was later shelved.

Filming
Production work began in Delhi on 15 November 2017, with Dulquer joining the shoot three days later, when  an official launch ceremony was held. The shoot was however briefly disrupted by the smog in Delhi during the period. In early December, the second schedule began in Goa, with shoots occurring using the backdrop of the beaches. The third and final schedule of the film began in Chennai during late January 2018, and progressed for more than a month. By July 2018, it was revealed that the film was close to being completed, with only five days of shoot remaining.

Soundtrack 

The soundtrack is composed by Masala Coffee. The background score of the film is composed by Harshavardhan Rameshwar. The first single track was released on 14 February 2020. The album was released on 21 February 2020.

Release

Theatrical
The film was released on 28 February 2020 along with its Telugu dubbed version title Kanulu Kanulanu Dochayante.

Home media 
The movie was available to be purchased for $1.99 on Simply South on 19 March 2020 for all countries except for India. The movie was released on Netflix on 29 March 2020 for all countries. The Satellite Rights were sold to Star Vijay which premiered on eve of Tamil New Year on 14 April 2020.

Reception

Critical reception 
The film received highly positive reviews from critics and audiences. 

Writing for Times of India, M Suganth gave 3.5 out of 5 and said that "Kannum Kannum Kollaiyadithaal is a winsome romantic thriller with charming leads and edge-of-the-seat moments. Desingh Periyasamy displays a flair for this material both in his writing and making." S Subhakeerthana of The Indian Express rated the 3.5 out of 5 and wrote that "The film rides on clever writing and performances. Some of the funniest moments of Kannum Kannum Kollaiyadithaal are those that involve Dulquer Salmaan and Rakshan. It is a performance-driven film, and the script gives both the actors many moments to shine, tapping into their sharp comic timing."
Sify gave 3.5 out of 5 and wrote that "Desingh Periyasamy has delivered an enjoyable romantic entertainer with enough brainy moments that keeps you hooked till the end. Though the film is lengthy compared to the current 120 minutes trend, it manages to keep us engaged." Writing for First Post, Sreedhar Pillai gave 3.25 stars out of five and said that "Kannum Kannum Kollaiyadithaal looks fresh, and is an enjoyable rom-com or more appropriately, a rip-roaring con ride, mainly owing to its smart writing." Anupama Subramanian for  Deccan Chronicle wrote that, "Debutant director Desingh Periyasamy's Kannum Kannum Kollaiyadithaal is a synthesis of a rom-com and a modern crime caper, without any pretence or preachiness. So it makes for a fun-filled ride."Behindwoods rated 2.75 out of 5 stars stating "Kannum Kannum Kollaiyadithal works majorly due to the twists and Dulquer's performance. An interesting Gautham Menon moment in the preclimax acts as an icing on the cake". The Hindu stated "Director Desingh Periyasamy does a commendable job of putting together a film that lets the script be hero, and keeps you guessing and entertained". The New Indian Express stated "This film also reminded me of a film like Catch Me If You Can, with a serious cop being in pursuit of some impish criminals who are a step ahead all the time". India Today rated 2 out of 5 stars stating "Kannum Kannum Kollaiyadithaal is interesting in a few places, thanks to the cat-and-mouse game between the lead characters. If you are willing to look past the superficial elements in the film, there's a nice story lying there on the side". Film Companion stated "It's how the film interprets Gautham Vasudev Menon's character — essentially GVM playing a GVM hero — that becomes a gift that keeps giving". Deccan Chronicle stated "Overall, Kannum Kannum Kollaiyadithaal is a fine outing for a first-timer worth watching".Baradwaj Rangan of Film Companion South wrote "I wish this had been a better movie, though. It needed to be shorter, tighter, far better staged. But most importantly, the twisty plotting needed to be much more convincing in taking us from A to G to K to C. But at a generic level (and sometimes, a bit more), it’s not bad at all." Rajinikanth called and appreciated Desingh Periyasamy. He also expressed his interest in doing a film with Desingh. Sowmya Rajendran from The News Minute Wrote that "Despite the lengthy runtime of 2 hours and 40 minutes, Kannum Kannum stays enjoyable for the most part. It may not blow your mind, but it’s good, harmless fun and god knows, the audience needs more of that"

Sequel 
In an interview, Dulquer Salmaan told that Desingh Periyasamy planned for the sequel and also narrated the opening 15 minutes to the team.

References

External links
 

Indian romantic comedy films
Indian romantic thriller films
2020s Tamil-language films
2020 films
Films shot in Chennai
Films shot in Malaysia
Films shot in Delhi
2020 romantic comedy films
2020s romantic thriller films
Films shot in Meghalaya
Films shot in Goa
2020 directorial debut films
Indian heist films
Films scored by Masala Coffee